Monstrotyphis carolinae is a species of sea snail, a marine gastropod mollusk in the family Muricidae, the murex snails or rock snails.

Description
The length of the shell attains 20.5 mm.

Distribution
This marine species occurs off New Caledonia.

References

External links
 MNHN, Paris: holotype
 Houart, R. (1987). Description of four new species of Muricidae (Mollusca: Gastropoda) from New Caledonia. Venus. 46 (4): 202–210.

Monstrotyphis
Gastropods described in 1987